Martin Bauml Duberman (born August 6, 1930) is an American historian, biographer, playwright, and gay rights activist. Duberman is Professor of History Emeritus at Herbert Lehman College in the Bronx, New York City.

Early life

Duberman was born into a Jewish family. His father, born in Ukraine, was initially a manual laborer but later founded a successful clothing business that sold uniforms to the government during World War II. His family used the money to move to Mount Vernon, New York and send Martin to the Horace Mann School, an elite private prep school.  He would later graduate from Yale College and Harvard University.

Activism
In 1968, he signed the "Writers and Editors War Tax Protest" pledge to refuse tax payments in protest against the Vietnam War. He was jailed, as a member, for a sit-in protest on the floor of the US Senate. His numerous essays on "The Black Struggle," "The Crisis of the Universities," "American Foreign Policy," and "Gender and Sexuality" have been collected in two volumes of his essays: The Uncompleted Past and Left Out: The Politics of Exclusion, 1964–1999.

He came out as a gay man in an essay (December 10, 1972) in The New York Times. A founder and keynote speaker of the Gay Academic Union (1973), he later founded and served as first director (1986–1996) of the Center for Lesbian and Gay Studies at the CUNY Graduate School. In 1997 he edited two volumes, "A Queer World" and "Queer Representations" containing selections from the Center's conferences. He was also a member of the founding boards of the National Lesbian and Gay Task Force, Lambda Legal Defense Fund, and Queers for Economic Justice.

Writing

He has written more than 25 books on subjects such as James Russell Lowell (a National Book Award finalist in 1966), Charles Francis Adams, Sr. (Bancroft Prize winner in 1961), Black Mountain College in the book Black Mountain: An Exploration in Community, Paul Robeson, the Stonewall riots, Howard Zinn, and the Haymarket affair, The Martin Duberman Reader-2013 and the memoir Cures: A Gay Man's Odyssey, 1991, 2002. His 2007 book The Worlds of Lincoln Kirstein was runner-up for the Pulitzer Prize.

Duberman's play In White America won the Vernon Rice/Drama Desk Award for Best Off-Broadway Production in 1963. Two of his other plays, "Visions of Kerouac" (about writer Jack Kerouac; Little Brown, 1977) and Mother Earth (about activist Emma Goldman; St. Martins Press, 1991) have received multiple productions. An anthology of his plays, Radical Acts: Collected Political Plays (The New Press, 2008), includes those mentioned, as well as Posing Naked.

Duberman edited (1994–1997) two series (a total of 14 books), "The Lives of Notable Gay Men and Lesbians," and "Issues in Gay and Lesbian Life." He also won three Lambda Awards one for Hold Tight Gently: Michael Callen, Essex Hemphill, and the Battlefield of AIDS in 2015, and two for Hidden from History: Reclaiming the Gay and Lesbian Past,  an anthology he co-edited; a special award from the American Academy of Arts and Letters for his "contributions to literature", 1988 winner of the Manhattan Borough President's Gold Medal in Literature, 1989 winner of the NYPL's George Freedley Memorial Award for "best book of the year" for "Paul Robeson".

His numerous other awards include the 1995 Public Service Award from the Association of Lesbian and Gay Lawyers, the 1996 Public Service Award from the Association of Gay and Lesbian Psychiatrists, the 2007 Lifetime Achievement Award from the American Historical Association, the Founding Father award, HGLC, the 2008 Whitehead Award for Lifetime Achievement in Non-Fiction, Bill Whitehead Award, 2009, Disting. Writing award, The Antioch Review, 2010. In 2012 Amherst College conferred on him an Honorary Degree, Doctor of Humane Letters, the Lambda Literary Award for Best Book of LGBTQ Nonfiction for Hold Tight Gently, 2014, the American Library Association's Stonewall Honor Book for Non-Fiction, 2015.   
Duberman received an honorary Doctor of Letters from Columbia University, May, 2017.

Duberman's novel, Jews Queers Germans, was published by Seven Stories Press in March, 2017. His most recent novel, Luminous Traitor: The Just and Daring Life of Roger Casement, a Biographical Novel, was published by the University of California Press in November 2018. His two most recent books are: Naomi Weisstein: Brain Scientist, Rock Band Leader, Feminist Rebel (Levellers Press, 2020), a collection of essays edited by Duberman, and the critical biography Andrea Dworkin: The Feminist as Revolutionary (The New Press, 2020).

See also
 LGBT culture in New York City
 List of LGBT people from New York City

References

External links 

 Martin B. Duberman papers, 1917–2010, at the New York Public Library
 Martin Duberman Collection, 1933–1980, at the State Archives of North Carolina Western Regional Archives

21st-century American historians
Historians of the United States
Historians of LGBT topics
Gender studies academics
LGBT Jews
Jewish American historians
American male non-fiction writers
American people of Ukrainian-Jewish descent
American tax resisters
Place of birth missing (living people)
1930 births
Living people
American gay writers
Horace Mann School alumni
Graduate Center, CUNY faculty
Paul Robeson
Lehman College faculty
Lambda Literary Award winners
Bancroft Prize winners
Historians from New York (state)
Harvard University alumni
Yale College alumni